Michael John Dobbs, Baron Dobbs (born 14 November 1948) is a British Conservative politician and author, best known for his House of Cards trilogy.

Early life and education
Michael Dobbs was born on 14 November 1948 in Cheshunt, Hertfordshire, the son of nurseryman Eric and Eileen Dobbs. He was educated at Hertford Grammar School, Cheshunt Grammar School, and Christ Church, Oxford.

After graduating from Oxford in 1971 with a third-class BA in philosophy, politics and economics, Dobbs moved to the United States. He attended the Fletcher School of Law and Diplomacy at Tufts University in Medford, Massachusetts, and graduated in 1977 with an MA, MALD, and a PhD in nuclear defence studies. His doctoral thesis was published as China and SALT: Dragon Hunting in a Multinuclear World. In 2007, Dobbs gave the Alumni Salutation at Fletcher.

Early career
Dobbs' studies at The Fletcher School were funded by a job as feature writer for The Boston Globe, where he worked as an editorial assistant and political feature writer from 1971 to 1975.

Politics
After getting his PhD in 1977, Dobbs returned to England and began working in London for the Conservative Party. From 1977 to 1979, he was an advisor to Margaret Thatcher, who was then leader of the Opposition. From 1979 to 1981, he was a Conservative speechwriter. From 1981 to 1986, he served as a government special advisor. From 1986 to 1987, he was the Conservative Party chief of staff.

In 1984, he survived the Brighton bombing at the Conservative Party Conference.  He was called "Westminster's baby-faced hit man", by The Guardian in 1987. From 1994 to 1995, he served in the John Major government as deputy chairman of the Conservative Party.

On 18 December 2010, Dobbs was made a life peer, as Baron Dobbs, of Wylye, in the County of Wiltshire, and was introduced in the House of Lords on 20 December. He sits as a Conservative Peer. Lord Dobbs is also an executive board member of the Conservative Friends of the Chinese. In August 2014, Lord Dobbs was one of 200 public figures who were signatories to a letter to The Guardian opposing Scottish independence in the run-up to September's referendum on that issue.

Dobbs supported a Leave vote in the 2016 United Kingdom European Union membership referendum. In March 2019, he expressed himself critically about the administration of Theresa May, stating that "[w]e have a flat-pack Cabinet that threatens to collapse every time you switch the telly on."

As of 13 October 2022, Dobbs was a member of the advisory board of the Parthenon Project, an organization that aims "to reunify the Parthenon Sculptures (also known as the Elgin Marbles) currently on permanent display in the British Museum with the other remaining originals in their home city of Athens" in Greece.

Business and journalism
From 1983 to 1986, Dobbs worked at Saatchi & Saatchi as deputy advertising chairman. From 1987 to 1988, he was director of worldwide corporate communications. From 1988 to 1991, he was deputy chairman, working directly under Maurice Saatchi.

From 1991 to 1998, Dobbs was a columnist for The Mail on Sunday newspaper. From 1998 to 2001, he hosted the current affairs programme Despatch Box on BBC Two.

Writing
Michael Dobbs' writing career began in 1989 with the publication of House of Cards, the first in what would become a trilogy of political thrillers with Francis Urquhart as the central character; House of Cards was followed by To Play the King in 1992 and The Final Cut in 1994. In 1990 House of Cards was turned into a television mini-series which received 14 BAFTA nominations and two BAFTA wins and was voted the 84th Best British Show in History. Netflix produced a US version based upon Dobbs's first novel and its BBC adaptation. He was an executive producer of the American series.

His novel, Winston's War (2004), was shortlisted for the Channel 4 Political Book of the Year Award, and his Harry Jones novels, A Sentimental Traitor and A Ghost at the Door, for the Paddy Power Political Book of the Year awards in 2013 and 2014, respectively. His novels are also published in the United States.

Anthony Howard of The Times said "Dobbs is following in a respectable tradition. Shakespeare, Walter Scott, even Tolstoy, all used historical events as the framework for their writings. And, unlike some of their distinguished works, Dobbs's novel [Winston’s War] is, in fact, astonishingly historically accurate".

Other work
Dobbs has been a judge of the Whitbread Book of the Year Award and lectures at dozens of literary and fundraising events each year.

Personal life
Dobbs, now a part-time writer, divides his time between London and Wiltshire. He has two sons from his first marriage and two stepsons with his second wife, Rachel.

Charity
Dobbs has raised money for his neighbour, who is paralysed as a result of a rugby injury. He walked from his home town in Wylye to his old school Richard Hale. He completed this on 27 March 2015. He is the patron of eye care charity, the Graham Layton Trust.

Namesake
Dobbs is a distant relative of the US non-fiction author with the same name. The two are sometimes confused, not unlike how Winston Churchill used to be confused with his namesake, the American novelist.

Bibliography
Francis Urquhart Novels
 House of Cards (1989)
 To Play the King (HarperCollins, 1992)
 The Final Cut (HarperCollins, 1994)

Tom Goodfellowe Novels
 Goodfellowe MP (1997)
 The Buddha of Brewer Street (1997)
 Whispers of Betrayal (2000)

Winston Churchill Novels
 Winston's War (2002)
 Never Surrender (2003)
 Churchill's Hour (2004)
 Churchill's Triumph (2005)

Harry Jones Thrillers
 The Lords' Day (2007)
 The Edge of Madness (2008)
 The Reluctant Hero (2010)
 Old Enemies (2011)
 A Sentimental Traitor (2012)
 A Ghost at the Door (2013)

Non-series novels
 Wall Games (1990)
 Last Man to Die (1991)
 The Touch of Innocents (1994)
 First Lady (2006)

References

External links
 
 Fantasticfiction.co.uk
 Blog.washingtonpost.com

1948 births
Living people
People from Cheshunt
Alumni of Christ Church, Oxford
20th-century British novelists
21st-century British novelists
Conservative Party (UK) life peers
The Fletcher School at Tufts University alumni
People educated at Hertford Grammar School
British male novelists
20th-century British male writers
21st-century British male writers
Life peers created by Elizabeth II
British Eurosceptics